Jollydora pierrei is a species of plant in the Connaraceae family. It is endemic to Gabon.

References

Connaraceae
Endemic flora of Gabon
Vulnerable flora of Africa
Taxonomy articles created by Polbot